Gonbad may refer to:
 Gonbad-e Qabus (city)
 Gonbad-e Sorkh (disambiguation)
 Gonbad, Ajab Shir, East Azerbaijan Province
 Gonbad, Bostanabad, East Azerbaijan Province
 Gonbad, Fars
 Gonbad, Hamadan
 Gonbad, Malayer, Hamadan Province
 Gonbad Chay, Hamadan Province
 Gonbad-e Kabud, Hamadan Province
 Gonbad-e Mahuiyeh, Kerman Province
 Gonbad Ab, Kermanshah Province
 Gonbad, Khuzestan
 Gonbad-e Bala, Kurdistan Province
 Gonbad-e Hajji, Kurdistan Province
 Gonbad, Sistan and Baluchestan
 Gonbad, Khoy, West Azerbaijan Province
 Gonbad, Takab, West Azerbaijan Province
 Gonbad, Urmia, West Azerbaijan Province
 Gonbad-e Molla Isa, West Azerbaijan Province
 Gonbad-e Vila, West Azerbaijan Province
 Gonbad, Zanjan
 Gonbad Rural District, in Hamadan Province